Let It Grow may refer to:

 A song by Eric Clapton recorded on 461 Ocean Boulevard
 A song by John Perry Barlow and Bob Weir, Part II of the "Weather Report Suite", first recorded by the Grateful Dead on Wake of the Flood
 A song by Renaissance on the album Ashes Are Burning
 A song featured in the movie The Lorax which became an Internet meme in late 2016.
 A joint campaign by BCGI, EAZA and ECSITE on biodiversity loss